A changing table is a small raised platform designed to allow a person to change a child's diaper.

Parents and carers of small children often find changing tables to be useful during a baby’s first year or two due to their comfortable height and because they often come with storage space in the form of drawers or shelves.

Public changing tables

Many public restrooms have public tables available should a diaper change be required in a public place. They are typically made of hard plastic and rest on hinges so they can be folded into the wall when not in use. They are usually not enclosed in a stall.

These became popular in the 1990s. Originally they were mainly found in women's restrooms. Through the lobbying efforts of Eric Letts, a founder of the Fair Parenting Project, it became commonplace to find them in men's rooms across Canada and the United States.

In 2016, President Obama signed the BABIES Act into law, requiring changing tables in all publicly accessible, federal buildings in the United States.

References

Tables (furniture)
Babycare